The Duchy of Lucca was a small Italian state existing from 1815 to 1847. It was centered on the city of Lucca. By the Congress of Vienna of 1815 the Duchy was to revert to Tuscany on the end of its Bourbon-Parma line of rulers or when the line would obtain another territory, which both happened in 1847, when Marie Louise of Austria died and the Bourbon-Parma recovered the Duchy of Parma. In accordance with the final act of the Congress of Vienna, the Duchy of Lucca then came into the possession of the Grand Duchy of Tuscany, which was annexed by the Kingdom of Sardinia (Piedmont) in 1860.

The Duchy was formed in 1815 by the Congress of Vienna, out of the former Republic of Lucca and the Principality of Lucca and Piombino, which had been ruled by Elisa Bonaparte. It was created to compensate the House of Bourbon-Parma for the loss of the Duchy of Parma, which had been given to Marie Louise of Austria.

In 1817, Maria Luisa of Spain, the former Infanta of Spain and Queen of Etruria, assumed the government of Lucca. She was also the mother of Charles Louis of Parma, the Bourbon heir to Parma. This followed the Treaty of Paris (1815), which confirmed both her sovereign status in Lucca, and her son's status as heir to Parma in succession to Marie Louise.

After Maria Luisa's death in 1824, Charles Louis assumed the government of the Duchy. In 1847 Charles succeeded to the Duchy of Parma, and left Lucca, which was annexed by the Grand Duchy of Tuscany.

From 1815 to 1818, the flag of Lucca was yellow and red horizontal stripes. From 7 November 1818, to 1847 the flag was white, with Maria Luisa's coat of arms and the yellow–red flag in the canton.

Dukes of Lucca (1815–1847)

Symbols

References

Further reading
Case, Lynn M., ed. "The diplomatic relations between France, the grand duchy of Tuscany and the grand duchy of Lucca, 2nd series, 1830-1848, vol 1, August 18, 1830 To December 28, 1843, Vol 2, January 9, 1844 To February 29, 1848-Italian-Saitta, A." (1961): 455-456.
 DiQuinzio, Mary Elizabeth. Opera in the Duchy of Lucca, 1817-1847. PhD Diss. Music) (Catholic University of America, 1997)
 Murray, John. A Handbook for Travellers in Central Italy: Including Lucca, Tuscany, Florence, the Marches, Umbria, Part of the Patrimony of St. Peter, and the Island of Sardinia. J. Murray, 1861.
 Ross, Janet, and Nelly Erichsen. The story of Lucca. (1912) online.

 
History of Tuscany
19th century in Italy

House of Bourbon

States and territories established in 1815
1815 establishments in Italy
States and territories disestablished in 1847
1847 disestablishments in Italy
Grand Duchy of Tuscany
Former monarchies of Europe
Former duchies